The Los Angeles Auto Show, also known as the LA Auto Show, is an auto show held annually at the Los Angeles Convention Center in Los Angeles, California, United States. It is open to the public for ten days, filling  of exhibit space. Since 2006 the event is held in November or December.

The LA Auto Show is an OICA sanctioned international exhibition.  It is one of the four major auto shows in North America together with Detroit, Chicago and New York.

The show begins with AutoMobility LA,  a several day press showing.

History
The Los Angeles Auto Show began in 1907 with ninety-nine vehicles on display at Morley's Skating Rink.  In 1910, the event was held under a canvas big top at Fiesta Park.   As the auto industry grew, the auto show changed venues four times throughout the 1920s to accommodate the growing needs of vendors.  In 1926, it took place at the corner of Hill and Washington where it stayed for the next four years.  During the 1929 show, a short circuit in one of the airplane exhibits caused a massive fire that destroyed the entire venue, resulting in over $1 million ($ in  dollars) worth of damages. There were no injuries. With the help of the community, the show reopened one day later at the Shrine Auditorium.

The show continued to prove successful throughout the 1930s, but took a down turn during the Second World War and went on hiatus from 1940 through 1951.  In 1952, the show re-opened at the Pan Pacific Auditorium with 152 vehicles on display, including those from international manufacturers.

In 2006, the show moved its dates from early January to late November/early December, thus resulting in two shows during the year. The second 2006 event celebrated the show's centennial, despite its 100th year being 2007.

AutoMobility LA
In response to new technologies such as driver assist and cloud-based infotainment in the auto industry, the LA Auto Show organizers created the Connected Car Expo in 2013.

The LA Auto Show begins with AutoMobility LA, four days catered to journalists, designers and industry representatives.  In 2014, the show had 65 debuts, a record number.  From 2013 to 2015, the first of three Press & Trade Days was devoted to the Connected Car Expo, a mingling affair for automotive and technology professionals. Connected Car Expo was merged with the show's Press & Trade days to create AutoMobility LA in 2016. For 2016, AutoMobility LA also included several events, with four days of networking, three days of breaking news, and two days of learning. The Press & Trade Days Kickoff Party was held for industry and media professionals the night before AutoMobility LA Conference. The Green Car of the Year Awards presented by the Green Car Journal. 2019 also marked the 10th anniversary of the Hispanic Motor Press Awards, presented to the best cars as selected by a national jury composed of Hispanic journalist, bloggers, and influencers. (www.hispanicmotorpress.org) During the Design LA Open House & Reception, automotive design studios present concepts to a judging committee, and the winner of judges' pick as well as people's choice award are both announced during the annual reception. During the Green/Tech Ride & Drive, there were test drives of new tech and green advancements exclusively for media . Automobile designers finished out Design LA at the Designers’ Night Reception hosted by Car Design News, which was offsite and required separate registration to attend.

2022
The 2022 Los Angeles Auto Show was held from November 18 through 27, 2022. AutoMobility LA took place on November 17.

Production model debuts

World debuts
 2024 Kia Seltos (refresh) 
 2024 Porsche 911 Dakar
 2024 Subaru Impreza
 2023 Toyota Prius, Prius Prime

North American debuts
 2024 Fiat 500e (European spec)
 2023 Genesis Electrified GV70
 2023 Hyundai Ioniq 6

Concept cars

World debuts
 Genesis X Convertible 
 Toyota bZ Compact SUV concept

North American debuts
 Hyundai N Vision 74

2021
The 2020 Los Angeles Auto Show, due to the pandemic, was cancelled and rescheduled to May 21 through 31, 2021. It was rescheduled again to November 19 through 28, 2021. AutoMobility LA, which includes auto show press days and vehicle debuts, took place on November 17 and 18.

Production model debuts

World debuts
 2022 Bremach 4x4 SUV
 2023 Fisker Ocean
 2023 Kia Sportage Hybrid
 2022 Lexus LX 600 (auto show debut)
 2022-23 Mazda CX-50
 2022 Porsche 718 Cayman GT4 RS, GT4 RS Clubsport
 2022 Porsche Taycan GTS
 2022 Range Rover (auto show debut)
 2023 Subaru Solterra

North American debuts
 2022 BMW CE 04 (electric scooter)
 2023 Nissan Ariya
 2023 Toyota bZ4X

Concept cars

World debuts
 EdisonFuture EF1-T 
 Hyundai Seven (Ioniq 7 concept)
 Kia Concept EV9
 Mullen Five (prototype)
 VinFast VF e35, VF e36 (prototypes)

North American debuts
 Mini Vision Urbanaut

2019
The 2019 Los Angeles Auto Show was held from November 22 through December 1, 2019. AutoMobility LA, which includes auto show press days and vehicle debuts, took place from November 18 through November 21.

Production model debuts

World debuts
 2020 Acura MDX PMC Edition 
 2021 Aston Martin DBX
 2020 Audi e-tron Sportback
 2020 Audi RS Q8
 2020 BMW 2 Series Gran Coupé 
 2020 BMW M2 CS 
 2020 BMW M8 Gran Coupé 
 2020 BMW X5 M, X6 M (auto show debut) 
 Bollinger B1/B2 electric SUV/truck 
 2020 Dodge Challenger 50th Anniversary Edition 
 2021 Ford Mustang Mach-E
 2020 Hyundai Ioniq (refresh) 
 2020 Karma Revero GTS 
 2020 Kia Niro Hybrid (refresh) 
 2021 Lexus LC 500 Convertible 
 2021 Lincoln Corsair Grand Touring (PHEV) 
 2021 Mercedes-AMG GLE 63 S
 2021 Mercedes-AMG GLS 63
 2020 Mini John Cooper Works GP
 2020 Porsche Taycan 4S (auto show debut) 
 2020 Subaru WRX, WRX STI Series.White 
 2021 Toyota RAV4 Prime (PHEV) 
 2020 Volkswagen Atlas Cross Sport

North American debuts
 2020 Alfa Romeo Giulia (refresh) 
 2020 Alfa Romeo Stelvio (refresh) 
 2020 Audi RS 6 Avant 
 2020 Audi S8
 2020 BMW X3 xDrive30e (PHEV) 
 2020 BMW 330e (PHEV) 
 2020 Buick Encore GX
 2021 Chevrolet Trailblazer
 2020 Fiat 500X Sport 
 2020 Genesis G90 (refresh) 
 2020 Honda CR-V Hybrid 
 2021 Kia Seltos
 2020 Land Rover Defender 110
 2020 Mazda CX-30
 2020 Mini Cooper SE (EV) 
 2020 Nissan Sentra
 2020 Porsche Macan Turbo (refresh) 
 2020 Porsche Taycan
 2021 Toyota Mirai

Concept cars

World debuts
 Hyundai Vision T (plug-in hybrid SUV) 
 Karma SC2 
 Kia Seltos X-Line concepts (Trail Attack, Urban) 
 Volkswagen ID. Space Vizzion

North American debuts
 Mercedes-Benz Vision Mercedes Simplex

Race car debuts

World debuts
 Hyundai RM19 
 Volkswagen Atlas Cross Sport R (Baja 1000)

North American debuts
 Porsche 99X Electric (Formula E)

2018
The show took place from November 30 to December 9, 2018, at the Los Angeles Convention Center. AutoMobility LA, which includes auto show press days and vehicle debuts, took place from November 26 through November 29. Around 1,000 cars were displayed at the venue. Like other years, visitors could sit in cars and test certain models in the Test Drive area. Newsweek observed that the show was "dominated by bulkier models" such as SUVs and trucks. Electric auto makers Byton and Rivian made their first appearance at the auto show. The last version of the VW Beetle made its local debut at the show. Volvo was at the show, but didn't bring cars, breaking tradition. The Honda Insight was named 2019 Green Car of the Year at the show.

Production model debuts

World debuts
 2019 Bentley Continental GT Convertible
 2019 BMW 8 Series Convertible
 2020 BMW M340i
 2019 BMW X7
 2019 Honda Passport
 2020 Hyundai Palisade
 2020 Jeep Gladiator
 2020 Kia Soul
 2019 Lexus LX Inspiration Series
 2020 Lincoln Aviator
 2019 Mazda3
 2019 Mercedes-AMG GT R Pro
 2019 Mercedes-AMG GT 2-door (refresh)
 2019 Nissan Maxima (refresh)
 2019 Nissan Murano (refresh)
 2020 Porsche 911 (992)
 2019 Porsche 911 GT2 RS Clubsport (991.2)
 Rivian R1T, R1S
 2019 Subaru Crosstrek Hybrid (plug-in)
 2020 Toyota Avalon, Camry TRD
 2020 Toyota Corolla Hybrid
 2019 Toyota Prius (refresh)
 2019 Volkswagen Beetle Final Edition
 2019 Volvo S60 (auto show debut)
 2019 Volvo V60 Cross Country (auto show debut)

North American debuts
 2019 Audi e-tron
 2019 BMW 3 Series
 2019 BMW 8 Series Coupe
 2019 BMW X5
 2019 BMW Z4 M40i
 2019 Fiat 500X (refresh)
 2019 Kia Niro EV
 2019 Maserati Levante GTS
 2019 Mercedes-Benz A-Class (sedan)
 2020 Mercedes-Benz GLE-Class
 2019 Mercedes-Benz Sprinter
 2019 Mini John Cooper Works Knights Edition
 2019 Porsche Macan (refresh)

Concept cars

World debuts
 Audi e-tron GT concept
 BMW Vision iNEXT (auto show debut)

North American debuts
 Byton K-Byte
 Byton M-Byte (also shown at CES 2018)
 Mitsubishi e-Evolution Concept
 Volkswagen I.D. Buzz Cargo

2017
The 2017 Los Angeles Auto Show was held from December 1 through December 10, 2017. AutoMobility LA, which included auto show press days and vehicle debuts, took place from November 27 through November 30.

Production model debuts

World debuts
Aria Group FXE
 2019 BMW i8 Roadster
 2018 BMW M3 CS
 2019 Chevrolet Corvette ZR1 convertible
 2019 Infiniti QX50
 2018 Jeep Wrangler (JL)
 2019 Kia Sorento (refresh)
 2018 Lexus RX L
 2019 Lincoln MKC (refresh)
 2019 Lincoln Nautilus (formerly MKX) (refresh)
 2018 Mazda6 (refresh)
 2019 Mercedes-Benz CLS-Class (C257)
 2018 Porsche 718 Boxster/Cayman GTS
 2018 Porsche 911 Carrera T
 2018 Porsche Panamera Turbo S E-Hybrid Sport Turismo
 2018 Range Rover SVAutobiography (refresh)
 2018 Range Rover Sport SVR (refresh)
 2018 Saleen S1
 2019 Subaru Ascent
 2018 Volkswagen Tiguan R-Line package

North American debuts
 2019 Audi A8
 2018 BMW 6 Series (G32) Gran Turismo
 2018 BMW i3s
 2018 BMW M5
 2019 Chevrolet Corvette ZR1 coupe
 2018 Hyundai Kona
 2018 Jaguar E-Pace
 2018 Jaguar XF Sportbrake
 2018 Jaguar XJR575
 2018 Kia Niro PHEV
 2018 Lexus LX 570 two-row
 2018 Mitsubishi Eclipse Cross
 2018 Nissan Kicks
 2019 Range Rover/Range Rover Sport PHEV
 2019 Volvo XC40

Concept cars

World debuts
 Mitsubishi Re-Model A (by West Coast Customs)
 Redspace REDS
 Toyota FT-AC

North American debuts
 BMW 8 Series (G15) concept
 BMW i Vision Dynamics
 BMW X7 iPerformance concept
 Jaguar I-Pace eTrophy racing prototype
 Land Rover Discovery SVX concept
 Mazda Vision Coupe
 MINI Electric Concept
 Volkswagen I.D. Crozz

2016
The 2016 Los Angeles Auto Show was held from November 18 through November 27, 2016. Press days and vehicle debuts took place on November 16 and 17.

Production model debuts

World debuts
 2018 Alfa Romeo Stelvio Quadrifoglio
 2017 Chevrolet Colorado ZR2
 2018 Chevrolet Equinox
 2017 Chevrolet Spark ACTIV
 2018 Ford EcoSport (facelift)
 2017 Honda Civic Si (pre-production prototype)
 2017 Jeep Renegade Deserthawk, Altitude
 2017 Lamborghini Huracan RWD Spyder
 2017 Mazda CX-5
 2018 Mercedes-AMG E63, E63 S
 2017 Mercedes-AMG GLE43
 2017 Mercedes-Maybach S650 Cabriolet
 2017 Mini Countryman
 2017 Nissan Juke Black Pearl Edition
 2017 Nissan Rogue: Rogue One Star Wars Limited Edition
 2017 Nissan Sentra NISMO
 2017 Nissan Versa Note (refresh)
 2017 Porsche Panamera (base, 4, Executive series)
 Rezvani Beast Alpha
 2018 Volkswagen Atlas
 2017 Volkswagen e-Golf (refresh)
 2017 Volvo V90 Cross Country

North American debuts
 2018 Audi A5, S5
 2018 Audi Q5
 2018 Genesis G80 3.3T Sport
 2017 Infiniti Q60 3.0t Sport
 2017 Jeep Compass
 2017 Kia Soul Turbo
 2017 Land Rover Discovery
 2017 Mercedes-Benz G550 4×4²
 2018 Mercedes-AMG GT R
 2018 Mercedes AMG GT Roadster
 2018 Smart ForTwo electric drive
 2018 Toyota C-HR

Concept cars

World debuts
 Hyundai Autonomous Ioniq concept
 Jaguar I-Pace EV
 Subaru VIZIV-7
 Volkswagen Passat GT concept

North American debuts
 Infiniti QX Sport Inspiration
 Mitsubishi eX

2015
The 2015 Los Angeles Auto Show was held from November 20 through November 29, 2015. Press days and vehicle debuts took place on November 18 and 19.

Production model debuts

World debuts
 2017 Buick Lacrosse
 2017 Fiat 124 Spider
 2017 Ford Escape (refresh)
 2017 GMC Canyon Denali
 2016 GMC Sierra Denali Ultimate
 2016 Honda Civic Coupe
 2017 Infiniti QX30
 2016 Jeep Grand Cherokee SRT Night
 2016 Jeep Wrangler Backcountry
 2017 Lincoln MKZ (refresh)
 2016 Mazda CX-9
 2017 Mercedes-Benz GLS-Class (refresh)
 2017 Mercedes-Benz SL-Class (refresh)
 2017 Mitsubishi Mirage (refresh)
 2016 Mitsubishi Outlander Sport
 2016 Nissan Sentra (refresh)
 Porsche Cayman GT4 ClubSport
 2017 Range Rover Evoque Convertible

North American debuts
 2017 Alfa Romeo Giulia Quadrifoglio
 2017 Audi R8
 2016 Audi RS 7 performance, S8 plus
 2016 BMW 330e (plug-in hybrid)
 2016 BMW 7 Series
 2016 BMW M4 GTS
 2016 BMW X1
 2017 Cadillac CT6 Plug-In Hybrid
 2017 Cadillac XT5
 Honda Clarity (fuel cell vehicle)
 2017 Hyundai Elantra
 2017 Jaguar F-Pace
 2017 Jaguar XE (U.S. specification)
 2017 Kia Sportage
 2016 Mini Clubman
 2016 Mini Convertible

Concept cars

World debuts
 2017 Subaru Impreza sedan concept

North American debuts
 Honda Project 2&4
 Hyundai N 2025 Vision Gran Turismo
 Scion C-HR
 Volkswagen Golf GTE Sport concept

2014
The 2014 Los Angeles Auto Show was held from November 21 through November 30, 2014. Press days and vehicle debuts took place on November 19 and 20.

Production model debuts

World debuts
 2016 Acura ILX (refresh)
 2015 Audi R8 competition
 2015 BMW X5 M
 2015 BMW X6 M
 2016 Cadillac ATS-V 
 2015 Chrysler 300 (refresh)
 2016 Ford Explorer (refresh)
 2016 Jaguar F-Type R Coupe AWD
 2016 Mazda CX-3
 2016 Mazda CX-5 (refresh)
 2016 Mazda6 (refresh)
 2016 Mercedes-Maybach S600
 2015 Porsche 911 Carrera GTS
 2015 Porsche Cayenne petrol V6 & GTS (refresh)
 2016 Shelby GT350 Mustang
 2016 Toyota Mirai fuel cell sedan
 Volkswagen Golf R Variant (Europe only)
 2015 Volvo V60 Cross Country

North American debuts
 2016 Audi A6, Audi A7 (refresh)
 2016 Audi TT Roadster, TTS Coupe
 2015 BMW 2 Series Convertible
 2016 Fiat 500X
 2016 Honda HR-V
 2016 Kia Sorento
 2015 Land Rover Discovery Sport
 2016 Mazda MX-5
 2015 Mercedes-AMG C63
 2015 Mini Hardtop 4 Door
 2016 Volvo XC90

Concept cars

World debuts
 Audi Prologue
 Bentley Grand Convertible
 Chevrolet Chaparral 2X VGT
 Chevrolet Colorado ZR2 concept
 Lexus LF-C2
 Scion iM concept
 Volkswagen Golf Sportwagen HyMotion

North American debuts
 Lincoln MKX concept
 Mini Superleggera Vision
 Mitsubishi Concept XR-PHEV
 Volkswagen Golf R 400
 Volkswagen GTI Roadster
 Volvo "Drive Me" autonomous vehicle

2013
The 2013 Los Angeles Auto Show was held from November 22 through December 1, 2013. Press days and vehicle debuts took place on November 20 and 21. The 2013 Connected Car Expo was held on November 19–21.

56 total vehicles debuted at the 2013 show, with 22 of them being world debuts. The following below are production models that debuted.

Production model debuts

World debuts
 2015 Acura RLX Sport Hybrid SH-AWD
 2014 BMW 4 Series (F32) Convertible
 2015 Chevrolet Colorado
 2014 Chevrolet Sonic RS sedan, Dusk
 2014 Chrysler 300S
 2014 Fiat 500 1957 Edition
 2014 Honda Civic (facelift)
 2014 Hyundai Elantra (facelift)
 2015 Hyundai Tucson FCEV
 2014 Hyundai Veloster Turbo R-Spec
 2015 Jaguar F-Type Coupé
 2014 Jeep Wrangler Willys Wheeler Edition
 2015 Lincoln MKC
 2014 Mercedes-Benz S65 AMG
 2014 Mercedes-Benz SLS AMG GT Final Edition
 2014 Mini Cooper
 2015 Porsche Macan
 2014 Range Rover Long Wheelbase
 2014 SRT Viper GTS Anodized Carbon Special Edition
 2015 Subaru WRX
 2014 Toyota Highlander Hybrid

North American debuts
 2015 Audi A3 sedan, S3 sedan, A3 Cabriolet, A3 Sportback e-tron
 2014 BMW 4 Series (F32)
 2014 BMW 5 Series Gran Turismo
 2014 BMW i3
 2014 BMW i8
 2015 Kia K900
 2014 Lexus CT 200h (facelift)
 2015 Mercedes-Benz GLA-Class
 2014 Mercedes-Benz S63 AMG
 2015 Nissan GT-R Nismo
 2014 Nissan Juke Nismo RS
 2015 Volkswagen e-Golf

Concept cars

World debuts
 Ford Edge Concept
 Mercedes-Benz Vision Gran Turismo Concept
 Mercedes Benz Concept GLA45 AMG
 Nissan Sentra Nismo Concept
 2015 Subaru Legacy Concept
 Toyota DAR-V

North American debuts
 BMW Concept X4
 Volkswagen CrossBlue Coupé
 Volkswagen Design Vision GTI

2012

The 2012 Los Angeles Auto Show was held from November 30 through December 9, 2012, with press days on November 28 and 29.

Production model debuts

World debuts
 2014 Acura RLX
 2014 Audi A6 TDI
 2014 Audi A7 TDI
 2014 Audi A8 TDI
 2014 Audi Q5 TDI
 2014 Chevrolet Spark EV
 2013 Chrysler Town & Country S
 2013 Dodge Avenger "Blacktop"
 2013 Dodge Charger R/T "Daytona"
 2013 Fiat 500C Abarth Cabrio
 2013 Fiat 500e e-Sport
 2013 Fiat 500L Trekking
 2014 Ford Transit Connect Wagon LWB US-spec
 2013 Honda Accord PHEV Sedan
 2013 Honda Civic
 2013 Honda Crosstour (facelift)
 2013 Hyundai Santa Fe
 2014 Jaguar XFR-S
 2013 Jeep Grand Cherokee SRT8 "Alpine" and "Vapor"
 2013 Jeep Wrangler Rubicon "10th Anniversary Edition"
 2014 Kia Forte Sedan
 2014 Kia Sorento
 2013 Lamborghini Aventador LP700-4 Roadster
 2014 Mazda CX-5
 2013 Mercedes-Benz GL63 AMG
 2014 Mercedes-Benz SLS AMG Black Series
 2013 Mitsubishi Outlander Sport Limited Edition
 2014 Porsche Cayman
 2014 Subaru Forester
 2013 Toyota RAV4
 2013 Volkswagen Beetle Convertible

North American debuts
 2014 Fiat 500L
 2014 Ford Fiesta (refresh)
 2014 Jaguar F-Type
 2014 Mazda6
 2013 Mazda CX-9
 2013 Mini Paceman
 2014 Mitsubishi Outlander
 2013 Porsche 911 Carrera 4
 2013 Range Rover

Concept cars

World debuts
 BMW Concept K2 Powder Ride Concept
 BMW i3 Concept Coupe
 Chevrolet Code 130RS Concept
 Hyundai Veloster C3 Roll Top Concept
 Mercedes-Benz Ener-G-Force
 Smart ForJeremy Concept
 Volvo S60 Polestar Concept

North American debuts
 Bentley Continental GT3 race car
 BMW i8 Spyder
 Lexus LF-CC
 Nissan Hi-Cross

Honda also announced the 2014 Accord Plug-In Hybrid will be available starting January 15, 2013 in California and New York.

2011
The 2011 Los Angeles Auto Show was held from November 18 through November 27, 2011, with press days on November 16 and 17. The Sneak Preview Night was held on November 17, 2011.

Production models

World debuts
 2013 Cadillac XTS
 2013 Chevrolet Camaro ZL1 Convertible
 2013 Chevrolet Spark
 2012 Dodge Challenger SRT8 392 Yellow Jacket
 2012 Dodge Charger SRT8 Super Bee
 2012 Fiat 500 Abarth
 2013 Ford Escape
 2013 Ford Flex (refresh)
 2011 Ford Focus ST-R
 2012 Ford Mustang Boss 302
 2012 Honda CR-V
 2013 Honda Fit EV
 2012 Hyundai Azera
 2013 Infiniti JX35
 2013 Infiniti IPL G37 Convertible
 2012 Jaguar XKR-S Convertible
 2012 Jeep Liberty Arctic Special Edition
 2012 Jeep Wrangler Arctic Special Edition
 2012 Lamborghini Gallardo LP550-2 Spyder
 2013 Lincoln MKS
 2013 Lincoln MKT
 2012 Mercedes-Benz ML63 AMG
 2012 Mini Cooper B-Spec Racer
 2012 Mitsubishi Lancer SE AWC
 2013 Porsche Panamera GTS
 2013 Shelby GT500
 2013 Volkswagen CC (refresh)
 2012 Volvo C70 Inscription

North American debuts
 Audi R8 GT Spyder 
 2013 Audi S6
 2013 Audi S7
 2013 Audi S8
 2012 Bentley Continental GTC
 2013 BMW M5
 2013 Ford Focus ST (production version)
 2013 Lexus GS 350
 2013 Mazda CX-5
 2012 Porsche 911
 2012 Porsche 911 Carrera S

Concept cars

World debuts
 Buick LaCrosse GL Concept
 Ford Fiesta ST Concept (5-door)
 Mercedes-Benz Silver Arrow Concept
 Subaru BRZ Concept STI

North American debuts
 BMW i3
 BMW i8 
 Jaguar C-X16
 Kia GT
 Land Rover DC100
 Volkswagen Beetle R Concept
 Volvo Concept You

2010
The 2010 Los Angeles Auto Show was held from November 19 through November 28, 2010, with press days on November 17 and 18. The Sneak Preview Night was held on November 18, 2010.

For the first time, the Design Challenge included entries from international design studios. This year's competitors were GM, Honda, Maybach, Mazda, Mercedes-Benz, Nissan, Smart, Toyota, and Volvo. The tied winners were GM with their Cadillac Aera concept and Smart with their 454 WWT concept.

Stefan Jacoby, president and chief executive officer of Volvo Car Corp, kicked off the Los Angeles Auto Show by delivering the Motor Press Guild (MPG) keynote address the morning of November 17, 2010.

The Chevrolet Volt won the 6th annual Green Car Journal 2011 Green Car of the Year award.  Other finalists included the Ford Fiesta, Hyundai Sonata Hybrid, Lincoln MKZ Hybrid, and the Nissan LEAF.

Production models

World debuts
 2011 Acura TSX Sedan
 2011 Acura TSX Wagon
 2011 Audi Q5 Hybrid Quattro
 2012 Buick LaCrosse with eAssist
 2012 Buick Regal GS
 2011 Chevrolet Camaro RS Convertible
 2011 Chevrolet Camaro SS Convertible
 2011 Chrysler Town & Country
 2011 Chrysler 200 Sedan 
 2011 Chrysler 200 Convertible 
 2012 Coda Electric Sedan
 2011 Dodge Avenger (facelift)
 2011 Dodge Durango 
 2011 Dodge Charger
 2011 Dodge Challenger R/T
 2011 Dodge Challenger SRT8 392
 2011 Dodge Grand Caravan
 2011 Dodge Journey
 2012 Ford Mustang Boss 302
 2011 Ford Transit Connect XLT Premium Wagon
 2011 Hyundai Elantra
 2011 Infiniti IPL G37 Coupe
 2011 Infiniti G25
 2010 Jeep Grand Cherokee Overland Summit
 2011 Jeep Liberty Jet
 2011 Kia Optima Hybrid
 2011 Lamborghini Gallardo LP 570-4 Spyder Performante
 2012 Mercedes-Benz CLS63 AMG
 2011 Nissan Leaf
 2012 Nissan GT-R Black Edition
 2011 Nissan Murano CrossCabriolet
 2011 Nissan Quest
 2012 Porsche Cayman R
 2011 Range Rover Evoque (5-Door)
 2011 Saab 9-4X
 2011 Scion xB Release Series 8.0
 2011 Toyota Corolla
 2012 Volkswagen Eos

North American debuts
 2011 BMW X3
 2012 Fiat 500
 2012 Infiniti M35h
 2012 Mazda 5
 2012 Mitsubishi i-MiEV (US version)
 2012 Nissan GT-R
 2011 Porsche 911 Carrera GTS
 2011 Porsche 911 Speedster

Concept cars

World debuts
 Cadillac Urban Luxury Concept (ULC)
 GMC Granite CPU Concept
 Ford Focus Race Car Concept
 Ford Focus by Ford Vehicle Personalization
 Ford Focus by FSWerks
 Ford Focus by 3dCarbon
 Honda Fit EV Concept
 Mercedes-Benz Biome Concept
 Nissan Ellure Concept
 Subaru Impreza Design Concept
 Toyota RAV4 EV Concept
 Volkswagen Golf Blue-e-Motion Concept

North American debuts
 Audi Quattro Concept
 BMW Concept 6 Series Coupé
 Ford Focus ST (pre-production Concept)
 Jaguar C-X75
 Kia Pop
 Mazda Shinari
 Lotus Elan Concept
 Lotus Elise Concept
 Lotus Elite Concept
 Lotus Esprit Concept
 Lotus Eterne Concept
 Volvo C30 DRIVe Electric

2009
The 2009 Los Angeles Auto Show was held from December 4 through December 13, 2009, with press days on December 2 and 3.  The Sneak Preview Night was Thursday, December 3, 2009.  Tickets for this event went on sale in October.

Bentley, Ferrari, Lamborghini, and Maserati did not appear at the show.

Production models

World debuts
2010 Allard J2X MkII Roadster
2011 Buick Regal
2011 Cadillac CTS Coupe
2011 Chevrolet Cruze (US version)
2011 Chevrolet Caprice PPV
2010 Dodge Viper SRT10 ACR 1:33 Edition
2010 Dodge Viper SRT10 ACR Voodoo Edition 
2011 Ford F-Series Super Duty
2011 Ford Mustang V6
2010 Honda Accord Crosstour 4WD
2011 Hyundai Sonata
2010 Mitsubishi Outlander GT
2010 Porsche Boxster Spyder
2010 Scion xB RS 7.0 ("Murasaki")
2010 Subaru Impreza WRX Limited
2010 Subaru Impreza WRX STI Special Edition
2010 Suzuki Kizashi
2010 Toyota 4Runner V6
2011 Toyota Sienna
2010 Volkswagen New Beetle Convertible "Final Edition"
2010 Volkswagen New Beetle Coupe "Final Edition"
2010 Volkswagen Jetta TDI Cup Street Edition

North American debuts
2011 Audi R8 5.2 V10 FSI Quattro Spyder
2011 Aston Martin Rapide
2010 BMW ActiveHybrid X6
2011 BMW ActiveHybrid 750Li
2012 Ford Grand C-Max (canceled)
2011 Ford Fiesta
2010 Hyundai Tucson
2011 Kia Sorento
2010 Lexus GX 460
2011 Lexus LFA
2011 Mazda 2
2010 Maserati GranCabrio
2010 Mercedes-Benz B-Class F-Cell
2010 Mercedes-Benz S400 Hybrid
2011 Mercedes-Benz SLS AMG
2010 Porsche 911 Turbo
2010 Porsche 911 GT3 RS
2010 Range Rover Sport Autobiography Limited Edition
2010 Rolls-Royce Ghost 
2011 Saab 9-5
2011 Volvo C30
2011 Volvo C70
2010 Volvo XC60 R-Design

Concept cars

World debuts
Capstone CMT-380 Microturbine Hybrid
Ford Fiesta by Ford Racing and Steeda Autosports
Ford Fiesta by H&R Special Springs
Ford Fiesta by Ford Custom Accessories
Ford Fiesta by 3dCarbon and FSWerks
Honda P-NUT Concept
Mazda 2Evil Special Concept 
Mazda Active2 Snow Concept
Mazda Active2 Surf Concept
Volkswagen up! Lite Concept

North American debuts
Audi e-Tron Concept
BMW Vision EfficientDynamics Concept
Lexus LF-Ch Concept
Mini Coupe Concept
Mini Roadster Concept
Mitsubishi Concept PX-MiEV
Subaru Hybrid Tourer Concept
Toyota Prius Plug-in Hybrid Concept

GM also held a press conference for the 2011 Chevrolet Volt (shown as a prototype at the 2008 show), announcing availability in California in late 2010, with other markets to follow later.

While Nissan/Infiniti did not hold any press conferences at the LA show, they unveiled the 2011 Infiniti M at an event in Beverly Hills to coincide with the show.  The refreshed 2010 Infiniti G sedan was also introduced at this time.

2008
The 2008 Los Angeles Auto Show was held from November 21 through November 30, 2008, with press days on November 19 and 20.

Facing a budget crisis, General Motors stated that they would cancel their press conferences and debuts for this year's show. Their current vehicles were still on display, and previously introduced vehicles such as the Chevrolet Volt still made an appearance. Chrysler also did not introduce any new models to the press, although its electric vehicle prototypes revealed in September (Dodge EV, Jeep Wrangler, and Chrysler Town & Country) were on display.

Production models

World debuts
 2009 Aston Martin DBS Automatic
 2009 Audi Q7 3.0 TDI Quattro Diesel
 2010 Bentley Azure T
 2011 Chevrolet Volt
 2010 Ford Fusion (facelift) 
 2010 Ford Mustang 
 2009 Infiniti G37 Convertible
 2009 Lamborghini Gallardo LP560-4 Spyder
 2010 Lexus RX 350
 2010 Lexus RX 450h
 2010 Lincoln MKZ
 2010 Mazda 3 Sedan
 2010 Mercury Milan (facelift)
 2010 Mercury Milan Hybrid
 2010 Mini E
 2009 Nissan 370Z Coupe
 2009 Nissan Cube
 2009 Pontiac G3
 2009 Pontiac G6 (facelift)
 2010 Pontiac G8 ST
 2009 Porsche Boxster (facelift) 
 2009 Porsche Cayman (facelift)
 2009 Saab 9-3 2.0T Convertible Special Edition
 2009 Smart Fortwo Brabus 
 2009 Spyker C8 Laviolette LM85
 2009 Volkswagen Touareg V6 TDI Clean Diesel

North American debuts
 2009 Audi A6 Quattro Sedan
 2010 Audi Q5 3.2 Quattro
 2009 Audi S4
 2009 Audi S6 Sedan
 2009 BMW 750Li
 2009 BMW 335d
 2009 BMW X5 xDrive35d
 2009 BMW Z4 (E89) sDrive30i Roadster
 2010 Cadillac CTS Sport Wagon
 2009 Ferrari California
 2010 Kia Soul
 2010 Lexus IS 250C 
 2010 Lexus IS 350C 
 2010 Lotus Evora
 2009 Maserati Quattroporte
 2009 Mercedes-Benz SL65 AMG Black Series

Concept cars

World debuts
 Chrysler Town & Country EV Concept
Dodge EV Concept
 Honda FC Sport Concept 
 Hyundai Sonata Hybrid Concept
 Kia Borrego FCEV Concept
 Jeep Wrangler Unlimited EV Concept
 Toyota Camry CNG Hybrid Concept
 Volkswagen Red Bull Baja Race Touareg TDI

North American debuts
 BMW Concept 7-Series ActiveHybrid
 Honda Insight Concept
 Hyundai HED-5 i-Mode
Mercedes-Benz ConceptFASCINATION
 Saab 9-X Air BioHybrid Concept

2007
The 2007 Los Angeles Auto Show was held from November 16 through November 25, 2007, with press days on November 14 and 15.

Production models

World debuts
 2009 Chevrolet Silverado 1500 Crew Cab Hybrid
 2008 Chevrolet Tahoe 2-Mode Hybrid
 2009 Chrysler Aspen Hybrid
 2009 Chevrolet Aveo 5
 2009 Dodge Durango Hybrid
 2008 Dodge Viper SRT-10 ACR Coupe
 2008 Dodge Viper SRT-10 ACR Roadster
 2008 Ford F-150 Limited SuperCrew
 2008 Ford Mustang Bullitt
 2009 Honda FCX Clarity
 2009 Lincoln MKS
 2008 Lotus Elise California Edition
 2008 Lotus Elise SC
 2008 Lotus Exige S 240
 2008 Lotus Exige S Club Racer
 2008 Mercedes-Benz C63 AMG
 2008 Mosler MT900S
 2009 Nissan Murano
 2009 Pontiac Vibe
 2009 Pontiac Vibe GT
 2008 Toyota Sequoia Limited
 2008 Toyota Sequoia SR5
 2009 Volkswagen Jetta TDI

North American debuts
 2008 Aston Martin V8 Vantage N400 Roadster
 2008 BMW 1 Series
 2008 BMW M3 Coupe
 2008 BMW M3 Sedan
 2009 Dodge Journey
 2008 Ferrari 430 Scuderia
 2009 Jaguar XF
 Lamborghini Reventón
 2008 Maserati Quattroporte Sport GT S
 Mercedes-Benz SLR McLaren Roadster
 2008 MINI Clubman
 2008 Mitsubishi Lancer Evolution X
 2009 Nissan GT-R
 2008 Subaru Impreza WRX STI
 2008 Volvo V70
 2009 Volkswagen Tiguan

Also present at the show were the 2009 Cadillac Escalade Hybrid and Cadillac Escalade Platinum, which were originally slated to debut at the Los Angeles Auto Show but instead debuted a week earlier at the South Florida Auto Show in Miami.

Concept cars
 Audi Cross Cabriolet Quattro Concept
 Hyundai Genesis Coupe Concept
 Mercedes-Benz S400 BlueTec Hybrid Concept
 Suzuki Makai Concept
 Vector WX-8 Concept
 Volkswagen Space Up Blue Concept

2006
2006 was the only year where the Los Angeles Auto Show was held twice in the same year. The first one ran from January 6–15, and the second one ran from December 1–10 (press conferences were held on November 29–30). The second event was held in celebration of the Los Angeles Auto Show's 100th anniversary, despite its centennial being in 2007. This was also the first year where the show was held toward the end of the year, and the last one held in January.

December 1–10
The Organisation Internationale des Constructeurs d'Automobiles listed this show under their 2006 season. It was also the first year the show has earned an international designation.

Production models

World debuts
 2008 Aston Martin V8 Vantage Roadster
 2007 Audi TT Roadster
 2007 BMW Hydrogen 7
 2008 Buick Enclave
 2008 Cadillac DTS-L
 2008 Cadillac DTS Platinum
 2007 Cadillac STS Platinum
 2007 Cadillac XLR Platinum
 2007 Callaway C16
 2008 Chevrolet Equinox Fuel Cell
 2008 Chrysler Sebring Convertible
 2008 Ford Escape
 2008 Ford Escape Hybrid
 2007 GMC Acadia
 2008 GMC Yukon Hybrid
 2007 Kia Amanti
 2007 Kia Rondo
 2007 Lamborghini Murcielago LP640 Roadster
 2007 Lexus LX 470 Limited Edition
 2007 Lotus Exige S
 2007 Lotus Sport Exige Cup
 2008 Nissan Altima Coupe
 2007 Nissan Sentra SE-R
 2007 Nissan Sentra SE-R Spec V
 2007 Saab 9-3 Sedan 60th Anniversary Edition
 2007 Saab 9-3 Convertible 60th Anniversary Edition
 2007 Saab 9-3 SportCombi 60th Anniversary Edition
 2007 Saab 9-5 60th Anniversary Edition
 2007 Saab 9-5 SportCombi 60th Anniversary Edition
 2007 Saturn Aura Green Line Hybrid
 2008 Saturn Vue

North American debuts
 Audi R8 
 2007 BMW X5
 2007 Hyundai Tiburon
 2007 Ferrari 599 GTB Fiorano 
 2007 Kia Sedona SWB
 2008 Land Rover LR2
 2007 Maybach 62S
 2008 Mercedes-Benz CL 63 AMG
 2008 Mercedes-Benz S63 AMG
 2007 Porsche 911 Targa 4 
 2008 Volvo C30
 2007 Volvo XC90 SE Sport

Concept cars
 Acura Advanced Sedan Concept
 Chevrolet Sequel Concept
 Ford Explorer Fuel Cell Prototype
 Ford Mustang by Giugiaro
 Honda FCX Concept
 Honda REMIX Concept
 Honda Step Bus Concept
 Hyundai HCD-10 Hellion Concept
 Mazda Nagare Concept
 Suzuki SXBox Concept
 Volkswagen Tiguan Concept

Audi, Volkswagen, and Daimler Chrysler also announced their plans for new BlueTec diesel cars, designed to meet stringent emissions standards.

January 6–15

Production models

World debuts
 2007 Chevrolet Aveo Sedan
 2006 Chevrolet Corvette Z06 Daytona 500 Pace Car
 2007 Chevrolet Suburban
 2006 Chrysler 300C Heritage Edition
 2007 GMC Yukon XL
 2006 Ferrari F430 Pista
 2006 Ford Explorer Sport Trac
 2007 Jeep Grand Cherokee SRT8
 2006 JEVC Battery-Powered Formula Car
 2006 Honda Accord Sedan US-spec
 2006 Honda Civic Coupe
 2006 Honda Civic NGV Sedan
 2006 Lotus Exige
 2006 Maserati Quattroporte Sport GT
 2007 Mazda CX-7
 2007 Pontiac Solstice GXP
 2006 Porsche Cayenne Turbo S
 2006 Saab 9-3 Cabrio "20th Anniversary"
 2006 Saleen Sport Truck S331
 2006 Spyker C8 Laviolette
 2007 Toyota Yaris Sedan
 2007 Toyota Yaris 3-door
 2006 Volkswagen Golf GTI 3-door
 2006 Volkswagen Golf GTI 5-door

North American debuts
 2007 Audi Q7
 2006 BMW M6 Coupe
 2006 Bugatti Veyron
 2006 Fisker Latigo 
 2006 Fisker Tramonto
 2006 Lamborghini Gallardo Spyder 
 2007 Mercedes-Benz S 550
 2007 Mercedes-Benz S 600
 2006 Porsche Cayman 
 2006 Volkswagen Eos

Concept cars
 GMC Pad Concept
Lamborghini Miura concept
Saab 9-5 Aero BioPower Concept
Volkswagen GX3 Concept

2005
The Greater Los Angeles Auto Show 2005 took place on January 7–16 at the Los Angeles Convention Center. Some 760,000 square feet of modern, well-lit exhibition space contains more than 1000 vehicles, plus a special floor devoted to the automotive aftermarket.

Production models
 BMW M3 Coupe Competition Package
 Chevrolet HHR
 Chevrolet Impala
 Chevrolet Monte Carlo
 Chrysler 300 SRT8
 Dodge Magnum SRT8
 Dodge Viper SRT10 Coupe
Ferrari 575 Superamerica
 Ford Mustang Convertible
 GEM Car EV NEV
 Hyundai Tucson FCEV
Mazda Mazdaspeed6
 Jaguar XK8 Victory Edition
 Pontiac G6
 Pontiac Solstice
 Pontiac Torrent
 Saleen S7 Twin Turbo
 Spyker C8 Spyder 
 Volkswagen Jetta Sedan

North American debuts
 Audi A3 
 Audi A4 
 Ferrari F430 
 Mercedes-Benz CLS55 AMG
 Mercedes-Benz SLK55 AMG
 Porsche Boxster 
 Venturi Fetish

Concept cars
 Bentley Arnage Drophead Coupe Concept
 Chevrolet HHR West Coast Customs Concept
Ford Shelby GR-1 Concept
 Suzuki Sunburst Reno SWT Concept
 Suzuki Techno Blue Aerio SX SWT Concept
 Vision SZR prototype
 Volvo XC90 Supercharged V8 Concept

2004

Production models
 BMW 330Ci Performance Package
 BMW X5 4.8is
 Bentley Continental GT
 Bentley Arnage T24 Mulliner
 Brabus Chrysler Crossfire
 Buick Terraza
 Chevrolet Cobalt
 Commuter Tango T600
 Ford Escape
 Ford GT
 Ford Focus
 Hummer H2 SUT
 Lotus Elise
 Lexus RX 400h
 Mazda6
 Morgan Aero 8
 Panoz Esperante GT
 Saab 9-2X
 Saturn Relay

Concept cars
 Hummer H3T Concept
 Pontiac Solstice Concept

2003
The Greater Los Angeles Auto Show ran from January 4–12.

Production models
 Audi A8 L
 BMW 330i Performance Package
 Chrysler Sebring
 Dodge Stratus Sedan
 Jeep Grand Cherokee (facelift)
 Ford Focus PZEV
 Mercedes-Benz C-Class
 Mitsubishi Lancer Evolution
 Mitsubishi Montero 20th Anniversary Special Edition 
 Pontiac GTO
 Scion xA
 Scion xB
 Subaru Baja Sport
 Volvo S60 R
 Volvo V70 R

North American debuts
 BMW Alpina Roadster V8
 BMW Z4 (E85) Roadster
 Ferrari Enzo
 Maybach 57
 Jaguar XJ

Concept cars
 Acura RSX Type-S Show Car by Good Guys
 Aston Martin DB AR1 Concept
 Dodge Magnum SRT-8 Concept
 Ford Faction Concept
 Ford Supercharged Thunderbird Concept
 Mazda RX-8 X-Men Car

2002

Production models
 Acura 3.2 CL
 Acura NSX
 Chrysler Crossfire Coupe
 Chevrolet TrailBlazer EXT 
 GMC Envoy XL
 Dodge Neon SRT-4
 Hummer H2
 Hyundai Tiburon
 Jaguar S-Type
 Ford TH!NK City
 Infiniti G35
 Lincoln Navigator
 Maserati Coupe
 Mazda MPV
 Mitsubishi Lancer Evolution VII
 Pontiac Vibe
 Toyota Matrix
 Volkswagen Jetta GLI
 Volkswagen New Beetle Turbo S
 Volkswagen Passat W8
 Volvo S80

Concept cars
 Lexus 2054 Minority Report Concept
 Lincoln Continental Concept
 Honda Model X
 Kia Trophy Truck
 Mitsubishi Montero Evolution Concept

2001

Production models
 Acura RL 3.5
 Acura TL 3.2 Type-S
 BMW M Coupe
 BMW M Roadster
 Cadillac Escalade EXT
 Daewoo Leganza
 Daewoo Rezzo
 Ford Crown Victoria
 Ford Mustang Bullitt GT
 Ford TH!NK Neighbor
 Isuzu Axiom
 Kia Rio Station Wagon
 Mazda Protege MP3
 Mazda Protege Sport Wagon
 Mazda Tribute MM
 Mercedes-Benz C230 Coupe
 Suzuki Grand Vitara XL-7
 Volkswagen Jetta GLX Wagon
 Volkswagen Jetta Wolfsburg Edition
 Volkswagen New Beetle Sport

Concept cars
 Chevrolet Borrego Concept
Dodge PowerBox Concept
 Ford Escape HEV Concept
 Pontiac Vibe Concept
 Toyota WiLL Concept

2000
Dates: January 8–16

Production models

World debuts
 Acura CL
 Daewoo Korando
 De Tomaso Mangusta
 Infiniti QX4
 Ford F-150 SuperCrew
 Kia Spectra GS
 Lexus IS 300
 Lincoln Town Car Cartier L
 Mazda Tribute
 Oldsmobile Aurora
 Panoz Esperante
 Pontiac Aztek
 Porsche 911 Turbo
 Rolls-Royce Corniche
 Saturn SC
 Saleen SR
 TRD Toyota Celica GT-S
 Volkswagen Golf 1.8T
 Volkswagen Jetta 1.8T
 Volkswagen Passat 4Motion

North American debuts
 Audi TT Roadster
 BMW Z8
 Hyundai Equus

Concept cars

World debuts
 Buick Regal Cielo
 Cadillac ElDoRODo
 Ford Focus Wagon Kona Edition
 Ford Mustang Bullitt
 Mercury Mountaineer
 Oldsmobile Profile
 Saturn CV1
 Subaru ST-X
 Suzuki Grand Vitara Platinum
 Toyota Celica Convertible
 Toyota Ultimate Celica
 Volkswagen New Beetle Dune

North American debuts
 Chrysler Java Concept
 Honda Spocket Concept

1999
The Greater Los Angeles Auto Show held this year January 2–10.

Production models
 Acura 3.2 TL
 Bentley Azure
 BMW 7-Series (facelift)
 BMW M5
 Buick Regal LSe
 Buick Regal GSe
 Chevrolet S-10 TrailBlazer
 Dodge Dakota NHRA Pro Stock Truck
 Dodge Dakota Sport Quad Cab
 Dodge Neon
 Dodge Viper ACR
 Geo Metro 3-door
 Honda S2000
 Isuzu VehiCROSS Ironman Edition
 Lamborghini Diablo VT Roadster Momo
 Lexus IS 200
 Mazda Troy Lee Special Edition B-Series
 Nissan Frontier Crew Cab
 Nissan Pathfinder
 Plymouth Neon
 Pontiac Firebird Trans Am Convertible "30th Anniversary"
 Porsche 911 Carrera 4
 Subaru Legacy Outback

Concept cars
 Dodge Power Wagon Concept
 Ford Focus Cosworth Concept
 Honda VV Concept
 Jeep Commander Concept
 Lincoln Blackwood Concept
 Mitsubishi Montero Sport CityCruiser Concept
 Saturn SC Performance Concept

1998

Production models
 BMW M Roadster
 BMW M3 Convertible
 BMW 740il
 BMW 750il
 Buick Regal 25th Anniversary Edition
 Cadillac Seville STS
 Chevrolet S-10 Xtreme
 Chevrolet Corvette Indy 500 Pace Car
 Chevrolet C/K Crew Cab Short Box Pickup
 Ford SVT Contour
 Honda Accord EX Coupe V6
 Honda Civic by Super Street Magazine
 Honda Civic by Pacific's
 Honda Civic GX CNG
 Honda Civic by Intrax
 Jaguar XJR
 Laforza Prima 4X4
 Lexus LX 470
 Mazda MX-5 Miata
 Mazda B-Series Troy Lee 4X4
 Mercury Cougar
 Nissan Altra EV
 Plymouth Prowler
 Porsche 911 Carrera Coupe
 Shelby Series 1
 Volkswagen New Beetle

Concept cars
 Chevrolet Astro Low Rider Concept
 Infiniti I30 Executive Luxury Special Edition (ELSE) Concept
 Lexus Street Rod Concept
 Vision K2

1997

Production models
 AC Propulsion Tzero
 Chevrolet Malibu
 Chevrolet Corvette Coupe
 Chevrolet S-10 Extended Cab
 Chrysler Concorde
 Dodge Intrepid
 Dodge Durango
 GM EV1
 Ford Contour
 Ford Ranger Electric
 Ford Windstar
 Honda EV Plus
 Mercury Mystique
 Mercedes-Benz E320 Wagon
Nissan Altra
 Porsche Boxster
 Saab 900 SE "Talladega Edition"
 Saab 9000 CSE Anniversary Edition
 Toyota RAV4 EV

Concept cars
 Ford Taurus Santa Fe Concept
 Honda Insight Concept
 Mercury L'Attitude Concept

1996

Production models
 Aston Martin DB7 Volante
 Bentley Turbo R Coupe
 BMW Z3 Roadster
 BMW 328i Signature Car
 Buick Century
 Buick Park Avenue
 Buick Park Avenue Ultra
 Cadillac Catera
 GM EV1
 Ford F-150
 Ford Escort
 Hyundai Elantra US-Spec
 Mazda MPV All-Sport
 Oldsmobile Intrigue
 Porsche 911 Carrera Targa Coupe

Concept cars
 Chrysler Sebring Convertible Prototype
 Ford Sport Trac Adrenalin Concept
 Mercedes-Benz AAV Concept
 Oldsmobile Bravada Concept Cure by Todd Oldham
 Toyota RAV4 EV Concept
 Volvo 850 Turbo Wagon by Boyd Coddington & Chip Foose
 Yugo Next Kiddie Ride Art Car
 Yugo Next Tiled Shower Art Car

1995
The 1995 Los Angeles Auto Show was held from January 7 through January 15.

Production models
Bmw M3 E36 Coupe
BMW 318ti Coupe
BMW 750 iL
 Chevrolet Tahoe
 Chevrolet Cavalier Z24 Coupe
Ferrari 456 GT
 Honda Odyssey EX
 Kia Sephia
 Lincoln Continental
 Mercedes-Benz C36 AMG
Mitsubishi Eclipse
Nissan 200SX Coupe
 Nissan Sentra GLE
 Pontiac Sunfire GT Coupe
 Porsche 911 Carrera Coupe
 Range Rover 4.0 SE
 Saleen Speedster
 Suzuki X-90
 Toyota Avalon
 Volvo T5-R Station Wagon

Concept cars
 Buick XP2000
 Pininfarina Ethos 3 EV

1994

Production models
 Chevrolet Lumina
 Dodge Neon
 Guldstrand Corvette GS90 Coupe
 Guldstrand Corvette GS90 Nassau Roadster
 Honda Passport
 Honda Accord Wagon
 Honda Civic NGV
 Ford Crown Victoria CNG
 Mazda Miata V8
 Mitsubishi 3000GT Spyder
 Mercedes-Benz E300D
 Pontiac Firebird Trans Am "25th Anniversary"
 Plymouth Neon
 Subaru Impreza Coupe

Concept cars
 Dodge Viper Defender
 Ford Ranger Sea Splash
 Ford Profile
 Isuzu Trooper Convertible
 Kia Sportage
 Nissan Future Vision Vehicle
 Volkswagen Concept One

1993

Production models

 Callaway SuperNatural
 Chevrolet Camaro Coupe
 Chevrolet Corvette Lister Convertible
 Ford Ranger Splash
 Honda CRX AC Propulsion Electric Car
 Isuzu Trooper RS
 Lexus GS300
 Lotus Esprit Turbo
 Mitsubishi Diamante Wagon
 Pontiac Firebird Coupe
 Porsche 911 Turbo 3.6 Coupe
 Saab 9000 Aero

Concept cars

 Calstart S.E.V. Showcase Electric Vehicle
 Dodge Viper GTS Coupe Concept
 Ford Mustang Mach III Concept
 Ford Ranger Jukebox Concept
 Oldsmobile Aerotech Aurora V8
 Oldsmobile Aurora Concept

1992

Production models
 Mercury Villager
 Ford Probe GT
 Isuzu Trooper
 Nissan 300ZX Convertible
 Nissan 240SX Convertible
 Nissan Quest
 Infiniti J30
 Ferrari 512 TR
 Ferrari 348 Serie Speciale
 Dodge Viper RT/10
 M.C.A GTB (Monte Carlo GTB)
 Mazda RX-7
 Subaru Impreza

Concept cars
 BMW E2
 IAD Clean Air LA 301

1991

Production models
 Mitsubishi Diamante
 Hyundai Elantra
 Nissan NX2000
 Maserati Shamal
 Subaru SVX
 Acura Legend L
 Mercury Grand Marquis

Concept cars
 Sterling MG EX-E
 Callaway Twin Turbo Speedster Concept

1990

Production models
 Mitsubishi 3000GT
 Mercedes-Benz 500SL
 Bentley Turbo R
 Toyota MR2
 Toyota Land Cruiser
 BMW 850i
 Lotus Elan Convertible
 Alfa Romeo 164
 Alfa Romeo Spider
 Ford Explorer
 Ford Escort
 Mercury Capri Convertible
 Dodge Stealth
 Dodge Shadow Convertible
 Buick Park Avenue
 Chevrolet Caprice Classic
 Chevrolet Blazer
 Chevrolet Beretta Convertible
 Chevrolet Camaro
 Avanti Touring Sedan
 Acura NSX
 Geo Metro Convertible
 Oldsmobile Bravada 
 Pontiac Firebird
 Hyundai S Coupe

Concept cars
GM Impact
Vector W2 Prototype
 Buick Lucerne Convertible Concept

1989

Concept cars
 Chevrolet California Camaro IROC-Z Concept

1988

Production models
 Buick Reatta

Concept cars
 Ford Bronco DM-1 Concept
 Plymouth Slingshot
Plymouth X2S

1987

Production models
 Buick Regal Coupe
 Eagle Medallion
 Range Rover

1986

Production models
 Chrysler TC by Maserati

1985

Concept cars
 Saab EV-1

1984

Concept cars 

 Bertone Corvette Ramarro

See also
 Green Car of the Year

References

External links

Official website
AutoMobility LA

Auto shows in the United States
Culture of Los Angeles
Economy of Los Angeles
Recurring events established in 1907
1907 establishments in California
Annual events in California
Festivals established in 1907